Zlatko Mojsovski (born 15 November 1981) is a Macedonian handball player for HC Butel Skopje.
He is the younger brother of Naumche Mojsovski.

References

1981 births
Living people
Macedonian male handball players
Sportspeople from Struga